Murder to Mercy: The Cyntoia Brown Story is a 2020 documentary film directed by Daniel H. Birman. The premise revolves around Cyntoia Brown, who was 16 years old when she shot and killed Johnny Michael Allen in 2004.

Release 
Murder to Mercy: The Cyntoia Brown Story was released on April 29, 2020, on Netflix.

References

External links
 
 
 Murder to Mercy: The Cyntoia Brown Story on Rotten Tomatoes

Netflix original documentary films
2020 documentary films
2020 films
American documentary films
2020s English-language films
2020s American films